Southampton Cemetery is located in Southampton, New York. Southampton has 47 public and private cemeteries.

Notable burials
 Roone Pinckney Arledge (1931–2002), sports and news broadcasting executive 
 Carl Andrew Capasso (1945–2001), sewer contractor convicted of tax fraud
 Jack Dempsey (1895–1983), heavyweight boxing champion
 Catherine Murray di Montezemolo (1925–2009), fashion editor for Vogue
 Tom Ewell (1909–1994), actor
 Patricia Kennedy Lawford (1924–2006), socialite and sister of U.S. President John F. Kennedy
 George Washington Martin II (1876–1948),  lawyer, jurist, and member of the Democratic Party
 Henry Augustus Reeves (1832–1916), U.S. Representative
 James Alfred Van Allen (1914–2006) astrophysicist who discovered the Van Allen Belts

References

External links
 Southampton Cemetery at Findagrave
 

Cemeteries in Suffolk County, New York
Southampton (town), New York